Tommy Nambahu (born 21 May 1960) is a Namibian politician and current Deputy Minister of Environment and Tourism. A member of the South West Africa People's Organization (SWAPO), Nambahu has been a member of the National Assembly of Namibia since 2010 and was a deputy minister of Justice from 2010 to 2015.  He also served as Deputy Minister of Labour, Industrial Relations & Employment Creation since February 2018.

A legal practitioner by profession, Nambahu holds master's degree in Law.

References

1960 births
Living people
Namibian lawyers
Members of the National Assembly (Namibia)
People from Oshikoto Region
SWAPO politicians
20th-century Namibian lawyers